Baihe Nature Reserve is located in northern Sichuan province in central China.  It is a home of the endangered Golden snub-nosed monkey and the Giant panda.  The reserve, founded in 1963, covers an area of 163 sq. kilometers.  It is near the Jiuzhaigou Valley and the scenic Huanglong Scenic and Historic Interest Area.

References

External links
 Chinaexploration.com: Baihe Nature Reserve
 Map of Baihe Nature Reserve, Protected Planet.net

Nature reserves in China
Nature reserves of Sichuan
Tourist attractions in Sichuan